William MacLean may refer to:
 William Q. MacLean Jr., American politician in Massachusetts
 William N. MacLean, Canadian politician
 William Ross MacLean, soda water manufacturer and political figure in British Columbia
 William Findlay Maclean, Canadian politician
 Billy Joe MacLean (William Joseph MacLean), Canadian politician

See also
 William McLean (disambiguation)
 Will Maclean, Scottish artist and professor of art